Lac La Biche-St. Paul was a provincial electoral district in Alberta, Canada, mandated to return a single member to the Legislative Assembly of Alberta using first-past-the-post balloting from 1993 to 2012.

Lac La Biche-St. Paul history

Boundary history
When created, the riding contained Lakeland County and the County of St. Paul No. 19 and all communities contained within, and was later expanded to include Two Hills. The Lac La Biche-St. Paul electoral district did not have any boundary changes throughout its history. The electoral district was dissolved in the 2010 electoral boundary re-distribution and replaced by the Lac La Biche-St. Paul-Two Hills prior to the 2012 Alberta general election.

Representation history

The riding's first representative was Paul Langevin, a Franco-Albertan elected for the Liberals. He left the Liberal caucus the following year, and went on to join the governing Progressive Conservatives. He was re-elected under their banner in 1997.

Upon Langevin's retirement, the riding was won by PC candidate Ray Danyluk, who served as Alberta's Minister of Municipal Affairs, and afterwards the Minister of Infrastructure. After three terms, he was defeated in the newly-renamed riding of Lac La Biche-St. Paul-Two Hills by Wildrose candidate Shayne Saskiw in the 2012 election.

General Election results

1993 general election

1997 general election

2001 general election

2004 general election

2008 general election

Senate Nominee Elections

2004 Senate nominee election district results
Voters had the option of selecting 4 Candidates on the Ballot

2004 Student Vote

On November 19, 2004 a Student Vote was conducted at participating Alberta schools to parallel the 2004 Alberta general election results. The vote was designed to educate students and simulate the electoral process for persons who have not yet reached the legal majority. The vote was conducted in 80 of the 83 provincial electoral districts with students voting for actual election candidates. Schools with a large student body that reside in another electoral district had the option to vote for candidates outside of the electoral district then where they were physically located.

References

Further reading

External links
Elections Alberta
The Legislative Assembly of Alberta

Former provincial electoral districts of Alberta
County of St. Paul No. 19